Tétouan is a province in the Moroccan region of Tanger-Tétouan-Al Hoceïma. Its population in 2004 was 613,506 

The major cities and towns are: 
 Dar Bni Karrich
 Karia
 Oued Laou
 Tétouan

Subdivisions
The province is divided administratively into the following:

References

 
Tétouan
Geography of Tanger-Tetouan-Al Hoceima